This is a list of casinos in North Dakota.

List of casinos

See also
List of casinos in the United States 
List of casino hotels

References

External links
 
http://www.ag.state.nd.us/Gaming/GACompacts/GACompacts.htm
http://www.ag.state.nd.us/Licensing/LicenseHolders/GamingSiteList.pdf

 
North Dakota
Casinos